The 2016–17 ABL season was the seventh season of competition of the ASEAN Basketball League. The regular season started on 25 November 2016 and will end on 26 March 2017.

Teams

Venues

Personnel

Imports
The following is the list of imports, which had played for their respective teams at least once. In the left are the World Imports, and in the right are the ASEAN/Heritage Imports. Flags indicate the citizenship/s the player holds.

Regular season

Standings

Results

First and second rounds
*Overtime

Third and fourth rounds
*Overtime

Playoffs

Semi-finals
The semi-finals is a best-of-three series, with the higher seeded team hosting Game 1, and 3, if necessary.

|}

Finals
The finals is a best-of-five series, with the higher seeded team hosting Game 1, 2, and 5, if necessary. The winner will provisionally represent the Southeast Asia Basketball Association (SEABA) at the 2017 FIBA Asia Champions Cup, unless a team outside SEABA wins; in that case, the best-performing SEABA team will be the provisional representative.

|}

Final rankings

Awards

The awarding ceremony was held before the Game 4 of the ABL Finals on April 23, 2017 held at the OCBC Arena in Kallang, Singapore.

 ABL Local MVP: Bobby Ray Parks Jr. (Alab Pilipinas)
 ASEAN Heritage MVP: Tyler Lamb (Eastern)
 World Import MVP: Marcus Elliott (Eastern)
 Defensive Player of the Year: Justin Howard (Singapore Slingers)
 Coach of the Year: Edu Torres (Eastern)

References

External links
 Official website

 
2016–17 in Asian basketball leagues
2016-17
2016–17 in Philippine basketball
2016–17 in Malaysian basketball
2016–17 in Hong Kong basketball
2016–17 in Singaporean basketball
2016–17 in Taiwanese basketball
2016–17 in Vietnamese basketball